is a Japanese music group, signed to Sacra Music under Sony Music Entertainment Japan.

History 
Who-ya Extended is a Japanese music group, whose main member is the vocalist Who-ya (20-year-old when they debuted in 2019). Members other than Who-ya change depending on songs although they have core members.

In November 2019, the group debuted with the single "Q-vism" from SME Records . The song was the opening theme of the TV anime "Psycho-Pass 3" which started broadcasting in the same month. The pre-released single on October 25 ranked No. 1 on the iTunes general chart, No. 1 in Amazon Digital Popularity Ranking, No. 1 in iTunes Anime Category, and ranked in the top 10 in Oricon weekly digital single rankings and so on.

In March 2020, they digitally released "Synthetic Sympathy" which was the theme song for anime movie "Psycho-Pass 3: First Inspector, started broadcasting in the same month. On April 15th, the first album "wyxt." was released.

On January 3, 2021, for the first time they appeared publicly in the online festival "Sony Music Anime Songs ONLINE Nippon Budokan" and performed "Q-vism" and "Synthetic Sympathy"

In January 2021, their new song "VIVID VICE" was selected as the opening song for the 2nd cour of the anime "Jujutsu Kaisen". On February 17, they released their first EP "VIVID VICE". The lead song "VIVID VICE" was pre-released in January and recorded the 1st place on Oricon's daily ranking. They also released the song in Acoustic Version, THE FIRST TAKE on YouTube.

On April 2, 2021, they held their first studio live on TikTok's program "Next Fire"

In Jun 2021, it was announced that their new song "Icy Ivy" was selected as the opening song for the new anime "Night Head 2041", which would be on air from July 14. The digital version of "Icy Ivy" was preleased on July 15 and 2nd EP "Icy Ivy" was released on August 11. Also, celebrating the new EP release, they held a special live in Tokyo on August 20, inviting 100 persons who purchased the CD of new EP.

It has been announced that on November 10, 2021, they will release their 2nd full album "WII" and will hold the 1st solo live on January 23, 2022.

Member 
Who-ya /Vocal, Lyrics, Composition
Who-ya was 20-year-old when they debuted.
He started to listen to the music influenced by his parents, especially his mother who likes international rock-bands. He was especially influenced by Chester Bennington from Linkin Park.
He was not a good singer until his primary school days.
He started to play music when he was in the third year of the junior high school. At that time, his friends asked him to join the band as the vocalist for a school festival and there for the first time he sang in public. Then he was fascinated by the greatness and possibility of entertainment and started to hope to play in the bigger places, which is the reason why he became a musician. The biggest turning point for him was the moment when he met the current members in Who-ya Extended when he continued to play in a band in the high-school.
His character is straightforward and stubborn. He likes to do things to make people happier.

Discography

Singles

EPs

Digital distribution only

Albums

Music videos

Opening and ending themes

Live

Events

Awards and nominations

References

External links 
 

Japanese rock music groups
Musical groups established in 2019
Sony Music Entertainment Japan artists